Willowgarth High School was a state school  in Barnsley, South Yorkshire, England. The school merged with Priory School and Sports College in 2011 to form Shafton Advanced Learning Centre (now Outwood Academy Shafton) The new school was initially based on both former school sites, but relocated to a new campus in 2012. The old school was subsequently demolished.

External links 
School Homepage
Archive Link

References 

Defunct schools in Barnsley
Educational institutions disestablished in 2011
2011 disestablishments in England
Educational institutions established in 1956
1956 establishments in England
Brierley